The Pechenegs were a semi-nomadic Turkic tribe.

Pecheneg may also refer to:
 Pecheneg language
 Pecheneg machine gun, Russian machine gun